Oliver John MacGreevy (25 July 1928 - October 1981) was an Irish actor who appeared in many British films and television series from the mid 1950s until he retired in 1980, often as brutish, shaven-headed villains.

Among his roles he played Housemartin in The Ipcress File (1965) and made an appearance as both the Gardener and the Electrician in the first episode of The Prisoner TV series ("Arrival", 1967). He also appeared in an episode of Thriller (1975).

On stage, he appeared in Tom Murphy's A Whistle in the Dark at Joan Littlewood's Theatre Royal, Stratford East, in London, 1961.

Filmography

References

External links

1928 births
1981 deaths
Irish male stage actors
Irish male film actors
Irish male television actors
Male actors from Dublin (city)